The White Rock River is a river in the South Canterbury area of New Zealand. It rises south of the  Mount Nimrod / Kaumira in the Hunter Hills and flows northeast then north to joint the Pareora River.

The white rocks are a cliff face with many layers of rock which are millions of years old, often used for study from scientists or school students.

References

Rivers of Canterbury, New Zealand
Rivers of New Zealand